Blossom Wigdor  (born June 13, 1924) is a Canadian clinical psychologist and gerontologist. She is a professor emerita at the University of Toronto. Wigdor was the director of the University of Toronto's gerontology program, the first of its kind in Canada. She founded the Canadian Association of Gerontology and was the first editor of the Canadian Journal of Aging. Wigdor was known for her efforts to raise awareness around discrimination against older employees and candidates in the workplace and the job market. She was named a member of the Order of Canada in November 1988.

Biography 
Wigdor (née Temkin) was born in Montreal, Quebec, on June 13, 1924. Her parents were Russian Jewish immigrants. She earned an undergraduate degree from McGill University in 1941. 

Wigdor married engineer Leon Wigdor in 1945 and moved to Toronto. She completed a master's degree in psychology from the University of Toronto, under the supervision of Mary Louise Northway.

Wigdor worked as a clinical psychologist in Toronto's Sunnybrook Hospital in the 1940s, then at Montreal's Queen Mary Veterans' Hospital. 

Wigdor returned to Montreal to in 1947 and began her PhD at McGill in 1949. After earning her PhD in clinical psychology in 1952, she taught at the university for another 27 years. She continued her clinical work during this time, and was named chief psychologist of Queen Mary Veterans' Hospital in 1961. 

At McGill, Wigdor developed an interest and specialization in gerontology. At the suggestion of collaborator Donald O. Hebb, she studied the cognitive development (including intelligence and memory) of older adults. 

Wigdor joined the University of Toronto in 1979 and became the founding director of its gerontology program, the first at a Canadian university.  

In 1989, Wigdor's book, The Over-Forty Society: Issues for Canada's Aging Population (co-written with economist David Foot), was published. The book examined the impacts of an aging population on Canadian society. 

In 1990, Wigdor was named chair of Canada's National Advisory Council on Aging. The same year, she oversaw the official opening of the Centre for Studies of Aging at the University of Toronto, which she was its director from 1989 to 1991.

Wigdor retired in the 1990s and became a professor emerita at the University of Toronto. 

Her husband, Leon, died in 1991. Wigdor remarried in 2002.

Bibliography

Books 
Wigdor, B. T. (1985). Planning Your Retirement: The Complete Canadian Self-help Guide. Grosvenor House. 
Wigdor, B. T., & Foot, D. K. (1988). The over-forty society: Issues for Canada's aging population. James Lorimer & Company.

Selected publications

In English 
Wigdor, B. T. (1952). an Approach to Personality Through the Investigation of Perceptual Behaviour.
Wigdor, B. T., & Morris, G. (1977). A Comparison of Twenty-year Medical Histories of Individuals With Depressive and Paranoid States a Preliminary Note. Journal of Gerontology, 32(2), 160-163.
Wigdor, B. T. (1991). Elder abuse: Major issues from a national perspective (Vol. 2). Conseil consultatif national sur le troisième âge.
Wigdor, B. T. (1992). Seniors' independence: Whose responsibility?. National Advisory Council on Aging.
McDonald, L., & Wigdor, B. (1995). Taking stock: elder abuse research in Canada. Canadian Journal on Aging/La Revue canadienne du vieillissement, 14(S2), 1-6.

In French 
Wigdor, B. T. (1991). Éditorial: Quelques réflexions critiques en lien avec la santé mentale des personnes âgées et l'usage des médicaments. Canadian Journal on Aging/La Revue canadienne du vieillissement, 10(4), 300-304.

Awards and honours 
For her contributions as "a pioneer in the field of gerontology", Wigdor was named a member of the Order of Canada in November 1988. She was awarded honorary degrees from the University of Victoria in 1990 and from the University of Guelph in 1994.

References

External links 
Blossom Wigdor Profile (Feminist Voices)

Living people
1924 births
Canadian women psychologists
Canadian gerontologists
Scientists from Montreal
McGill University alumni
Academic staff of McGill University
University of Toronto alumni
Academic staff of the University of Toronto
Members of the Order of Canada